The Liaoning Gymnasium is an indoor arena in Shenyang, China.  The arena used mainly for basketball and other indoor sports.  The facility has a capacity of 10,000 people and was opened in 2007.  It is located next to Shenyang Olympic Sports Centre Stadium.  Currently it is the host stadium of Liaoning Leopards, a top team in the Chinese Basketball Association (CBA).

External links
 Arena information

References

Basketball venues in China
Buildings and structures in Shenyang
Indoor arenas in China
Sport in Shenyang
Sports venues in Liaoning
Sports venues completed in 2007